Nicks Spring is a spring in the U.S. state of Oregon.

Nicks Spring was named in the 1870s after Nicholas Wright, a local miner.

References

Rivers of Oregon
Rivers of Jackson County, Oregon